Mason Douglas Williams (born August 24, 1938) is an American classical guitarist, composer, singer, writer, comedian, and poet, best known for his 1968 instrumental "Classical Gas" and for his work as a comedy writer on The Smothers Brothers Comedy Hour, The Glen Campbell Goodtime Hour, and Saturday Night Live.

Early life 
Williams was born in Abilene, Texas, the son of Jackson Eugene (a tile setter) and Kathlyn (née Nations) Williams.

Williams grew up dividing his time between living with his father in Oklahoma and his mother in Oakridge, Oregon. He graduated from Northwest Classen High School in Oklahoma City, Oklahoma in 1956. It was in Oklahoma that he began his lifelong friendship with artist Edward Ruscha.

He attended Oklahoma City University (1957–60) and North Texas State University for one semester, and served in the United States Navy from 1961 to 1963.

Career

Music 
In 1968, Williams won three Grammy Awards for his guitar instrumental "Classical Gas". "Classical Gas" was released as a single from The Mason Williams Phonograph Record in 1968. "Classical Gas" won three Grammys that year for "Best Instrumental (theme) Composition", "Best Instrumental (theme) Performance", and "Best Instrumental Orchestra Arrangement", Mike Post, arranger. It sold over one million copies, and was awarded a gold disc. He also wrote songs for The Kingston Trio. For both Handmade and Sharepickers, Mason received two more Grammy nominations for "Best Album Cover Design".Together with Nancy Ames, he wrote "Cinderella Rockefella", a 1968 number one hit for Esther and Abi Ofarim in the United Kingdom.

In 1970, Williams made a television appearance on a variety show, Just Friends, which reunited regulars of The Smothers Brothers Comedy Hour. To create a visual element for his performance, he used a special playable classical plexiglass guitar built for him by Billy Cheatwood and a prop designer for ABC. For the performance, Williams filled the guitar with water and added a couple of goldfish. He then used the plexiglass guitar to finger-sync his hit version of "Classical Gas".

Williams has recorded more than a dozen albums, five on the Warner Bros. label (The Mason Williams Phonograph Record, The Mason Williams Ear Show, Music, Handmade, and Sharepickers). The LP cover for the 1968 Music was painted by pop artist Edward Ruscha. The credit reads "Sorry, Cover by Edward Ruscha."

In December 1970, Williams performed benefit concerts for the Pala Indian Reservation Cultural Center hosted by Clairemont High School. Sponsored by the nonprofit Americans for Indian Future and Tradition, with the help of Ken Kragen and Friends, Williams performed two shows. The event raised enough funds to pay for the construction of the block walls.

In 1987, he teamed with Mannheim Steamroller to release a new album on the American Gramaphone label. The album, titled Classical Gas, included a remake of the 1968 composition. Another track from the album, "Country Idyll", was a 1988 nominee for a Grammy in the country music category for "Best Instrumental Performance by a Soloist, Group or Orchestra". The album went gold in 1991. Williams' plexiglass guitar appears on the cover of the album. He released an acoustic instrumental album of Christmas and holiday music, A Gift of Song, on the Real Music label, featuring arrangements of traditional carols and original compositions.

In 1992, the Vanguard label released Music 1968–1971, a compilation of tracks from his five Warner Bros. albums recorded in the late 1960s and early 1970s. Williams relates that when compiling the album he went to Warner Bros. and asked "Where's that painting that Ed Ruscha did for that old [Music] cover?" and was told it had been thrown away; a probable loss of 3–5 million dollars.

In conjunction with the release of this album, Williams added a "Holiday Concert Program" to his repertoire, featuring music from the album as well as other traditional music of the season. In 1994, he played six sold-out concerts with the Oregon Symphony in Portland, Oregon. In the 1990s he also performed with the Eugene Symphony with friend Ken Kesey.

Williams then concentrated on a variety of programs for his concert appearances. His "Concert For Bluegrass Band And Orchestra", also titled "Symphonic Bluegrass", has been performed with over 40 symphony orchestras, including the Colorado Symphony Orchestra, Kansas City Symphony, Louisiana Philharmonic Orchestra, Oklahoma City Philharmonic, Louisville Orchestra, and the Edmonton Symphony Orchestra.

In 1984, Williams released an album, Of Time & Rivers Flowing, on his own Skookum label, containing 14 of the approximately 35 songs performed in the concert. In 1993, the title cut from the album was used as the soundtrack for a ninety-second public service announcement (PSA) created by the American Rivers Council  on the home video release of A River Runs Through It. The PSA was also on the 1995 home video release of The River Wild. That same year, in 1995, Williams was invited to play for Oregon governor John Kitzhaber's inauguration and in 1996, Williams received an honorary Doctorate of Music from his alma mater, Oklahoma City University.

In 1998, BMI, the performance rights organization that tracks air play performances on radio and television, presented Williams with a Special Citation of Achievement in recognition of the great national and international popularity of "Classical Gas". By 2008, the song logged over six million broadcast performances, to become the all-time number-one instrumental composition for air play in BMI's repertoire.

In 1999, Williams played again for the Kitzhaber's second inauguration. In February, Williams' "Bus" art piece was included in the Norton Simon Museum exhibition "Radical Past", in Pasadena, California. In the spring he played his Of Time and Rivers Flowing concert with the Oregon Children's Choral Festival, a two-day event involving 3,000 elementary school children singing water and rivers songs with Williams and his band. Williams received the Distinguished Service Award from the University of Oregon in honor of his contribution to the arts in Oregon. In late 1999, he and the Bluegrass Band played for Byron Berline's Oklahoma International Bluegrass Festival in Guthrie, Oklahoma with the Oklahoma City Philharmonic.

Williams' music has been featured in several movies including The Story of Us, Cheaper by the Dozen, The Dish, The Heidi Chronicles, and Heartbreakers. His compositions also have been played on the television series The Sopranos.

In 2003, Williams released an EP, Music for the Epicurean Harkener, and again was nominated for a Grammy in 2004 for best instrumental album. In 2005, he collaborated with UK guitarist Zoe McCulloch on the album Electrical Gas.

In June 2006, Williams performed at his 50th high school reunion at Northwest Classen High School in Oklahoma City. He performed with other musicians as 'Mason Williams and Friends' at concerts in Eugene and Springfield (Oregon) and at the opening gala at the Richard E. Wildish Community Theater in Springfield.

In January 2007, he was reunited with long-time friend and artist Edward Ruscha, performing at the Getty Center in Los Angeles.

In October 2007, he was inducted into the Oregon Music Hall of Fame. and co-headlined a concert with Everclear and Paul Revere and the Raiders.

In 2022, BGO Records announced the release of a 2-cd collection of five of his early albums.

Comedy 
Like many writer-performers, Williams was also a stand-up comedian. He set most of his comic ideas to music and sang or recited the jokes in lyric form with guitar accompaniment. In 1964, Vee-Jay Records released Them Poems, a record album on which Williams entertains a live audience with "them poems about them people", covering such varied topics as "Them Moose Goosers", "Them Sand Pickers", and "Them Surf Serfs". A typical "them poem" is "Them Banjo Pickers", which begins: "Them banjo pickers! Mighty funny ways. Same damn song for three or four days!" Several other "them" poems, along with many ditties, song lyrics, odd and amusing photographs from around the country, and assorted bits of visual and verbal silliness are collected in The Mason Williams Reading Matter (Doubleday, 1969), and the Them Poems record album was reissued (also in 1969, on the heels of the success of "Classical Gas") as The Mason Williams Listening Matter.

Williams has written more than 175 hours of music and comedy for network television programming and was a prime creative force for CBS' controversial Smothers Brothers Comedy Hour. His experience in folk music gave him the background for many of Tom and Dick Smothers' comedy routines and with co-writer Nancy Ames, also composed the show's musical theme.

It was on the Smothers Brothers Comedy Hour that he created and perpetuated the 1968 "Pat Paulsen for President" campaign, an elaborate political satire. Williams also helped launch the career of entertainer Steve Martin. Martin was hired by Williams as a writer on the Smothers Brothers Comedy Hour, for which his contributions were initially paid out of Williams' own pocket. In 1968, he won an Emmy Award for his work as a comedy writer on The Smothers Brothers Comedy Hour.

Other television personalities he has written for include Andy Williams, Glen Campbell, Dinah Shore, Roger Miller, and Petula Clark. In 1980, Williams briefly served as head writer for NBC's Saturday Night Live, but left after clashing with producer Jean Doumanian. In 1988, Williams received his third Emmy nomination as a comedy writer for his work on The Smothers Brothers 20th Reunion Special on CBS.

In February 2000, Williams participated in the U.S. Comedy Arts Festival in Aspen, Colorado. The sixth annual festival honored The Smothers Brothers Comedy Hour and its contribution to television. Williams performed a concert with Tom and Dick Smothers, and again on a late night show with performers that included Catherine O'Hara, Martin Short, Andrea Martin, Steve Martin, Robin Williams, and Marc Shaiman.

Other artistic work
Also a photographer, Williams published a life-sized photo print of a Greyhound bus in the 1960s.

He appeared with the print on the cover of his first album, The Mason Williams Phonograph Record.

Environmentalism 
After becoming involved in protests against a Willamette River hydroelectric power project, Williams eventually collected over 400 songs about rivers.

He created a program called Of Time and Rivers Flowing. that encompasses classical, folk, minstrel, gospel, jazz, country, pop & contemporary rock.

Personal life 
Williams married Sheila Ann Massey on April 22, 1961; they had one daughter, Kathryn Michelle, before divorcing.

He remarried, to Katherine Elizabeth Kahn, in February 1994; the couple divorced after ten years.

He lives in Eugene, Oregon, with his Canadian-born wife, Karen, an attorney.

Discography

Albums
Them Poems, Rel. 1964
The Mason Williams Phonograph Record, Rel. 2/1968
The Mason Williams Ear Show, Rel. 11/1968
Music, Rel. 3/1969; #27 Canada, June 23, 1969
The Mason Williams Listening Matter (Them Poems re-release), Rel. 3/1969
Handmade, Rel. 3/1970
Sharepickers, Rel. 10/1971
Of Time & Rivers Flowing, Rel. 12/1984
Music 1968-1971, Rel. 7/1992
A Gift of Song, Rel. 9/1992
Of Time & Rivers Flowing, Re-rel. 5/1997
Classical Gas, at the Wildish Theater, Rel. 12/2006

Singles
 "Love Are Wine" / "The Exciting Accident", April 1966
 "Classical Gas" / "Long Time Blues", April 1968
 "Baroque-a-Nova" / "Wanderlove", August 1968
 "Saturday Night at the World" / "One Minute Commercial", October 1968
 "Greensleeves" / "$13 Stella", March 1969
 "A Gift Of Song" / "A Major Thing", June 1969
 "José's Piece" / "Find a Reason To Believe, June 1970
 "Train Ride in G" / "Here I Am Again", August 1971

EPs
EP 2003: Music for the Epicurean Harkener, Rel. 12/2003
O Christmas Three, Rel. 12/2009

For others
Folk Baroque, producer/arranger, Rel. 10/1963
Introducing Jayne Heather, arranger/musician, Rel. 12/1965
Tour de Farce, The Smothers Brothers, sideman/songwriter, Rel. 1965
The Smothers Brothers Play It Straight, co-producer, Rel 1966
Jennifer (Jennifer Warnes), guest vocalist, Rel. 1969
Fiddle & A Song, Byron Berline CD, sideman, Rel. 9/1995
1995 Sony Disc Manufacturing Holiday Choir, producer, Rel. 12.1995

With others
Little Billy Blue Shoes b/w Run Comeun See, The Wayfarers Trio, Rel. 1960
Folk Music as Heard at the Gourd, unknown group name, Rel. 8/1960
Songs of the Blue and Grey, The Wayfarers Trio, Rel. 4/1961
Away All Boats (EP), unknown group name, Rel. 4/1962
More Hootenanny (LP), The Hootenaires, Rel. 8/1963
Fresh Fish (LP), as Mason Williams & the Santa Fe Recital, Rel. 1978
Classical Gas, with Mannheim Steamroller (LP), Rel. 10/1987
Electrical Gas, with Zoe McCulloch (CD), Rel. 7/2005
Classical Gas, with Craig Einhorn, Rel. 9/2006

Compilation appearances
The Big Hootenanny, Rel. 1963
I Am an American, Rel. 3/1963
The Twelve-String Story Vol. 1, Rel. 1963
The Twelve-String Story Vol. 2, Rel. 1963
The Banjo Story, Rel. 1963
5-String Banjo Greats, Rel. 4/1964
Rock Instrumental Classics Vol. 2 - The Sixties. Rel. 1994
1968 Billboard Top Pop Hits (CD)
Cascadia (1996 Oregon Governor's Arts Awards) Rel. 4/1996

Misc.
40th Anniversary of Classical Gas, Rel. 4/2008

Bibliography

References

External links 
 
 Classical Gas
 
 
 

1938 births
Living people
American classical guitarists
American male guitarists
Emmy Award winners
People from Abilene, Texas
Grammy Award winners
Northwest Classen High School alumni
Oklahoma City University alumni
People from Oakridge, Oregon
Musicians from Eugene, Oregon
Musicians from Oklahoma City
Vanguard Records artists
Writers Guild of America Award winners
Guitarists from Oregon
Guitarists from Oklahoma
20th-century American guitarists
20th-century American male musicians
Classical musicians from Oregon